The women's 100 metres hurdles at the 2011 World Championships in Athletics was held at the Daegu Stadium on September 2 and 3.

Prior to the competition, Australian Sally Pearson led the season's rankings with a time of 12.48 seconds and was undefeated on the Diamond League circuit. The United States team provided the next fastest athletes that year in the form of Kellie Wells, Danielle Carruthers and the 2008 Olympic champion Dawn Harper. The defending champion Brigitte Foster-Hylton of Jamaica was in poor form, while the other 2009 medalists (Priscilla Lopes-Schliep and Delloreen Ennis-London) were absent. Tiffany Porter, Lisa Urech and Perdita Felicien were the only other top-ten-ranked athletes to compete.

Pearson won her semi final in 12.36, equal to the number 5 performer in history. The time improved on her own Oceanian area record and Australian national record. Wells had a large lead in her semi final, but clipped the ninth hurdle and struggled to maintain her balance as she finished in second.

In the final Pearson led from the gun and was not challenged, running 12.28, the fastest time in nearly two decades and moving her to fourth on the all-time list. The time is a new Championship record and again improved her Oceanian area record and Australian national record. Behind her, Carruthers outleaned Harper for the silver medal, both athletes finishing in the same time. Wells hit the seventh hurdle and did not finish.

Medalists

Records
Prior to the competition, the records were as follows:

Qualification standards

Schedule

Results

Heats
Qualification: First 4 in each heat (Q) and the next 4 fastest (q) advance to the semifinals.

Wind:Heat 1: +1.0 m/s, Heat 2: -0.6 m/s, Heat 3: -1.6 m/s, Heat 4: 0.0 m/s, Heat 5: +1.3 m/s

Semifinals
Qualification: First 2 in each heat (Q) and the next 2 fastest (q) advance to the final.

Wind:Heat 1: -0.1 m/s, Heat 2: +0.3 m/s, Heat 3: +0.7 m/s

Final
Wind" +1.1 m/s

References

External links
 100 metre hurdles results at IAAF website

Hurdles 110
Sprint hurdles at the World Athletics Championships
2011 in women's athletics